The Office of the Documentation and the Investigation of the Crimes of Communism (abbrev. ÚDV) is the Czech police subdivision which investigated criminal acts from 1948 to 1989 which were unsolvable for political reasons during the Czechoslovak communist regime.

See also
 Institute for the Study of Totalitarian Regimes

External links
 Official website of the office

Anti-communism in the Czech Republic
Law enforcement agencies in the Czech Republic
Commemoration of communist crimes
Decommunization
Truth and reconciliation commissions